This is a list of schools in the City of Milton Keynes, in the English county of Buckinghamshire.

State-funded schools

Primary schools

Abbeys Primary School, Bletchley
Ashbrook School, Two Mile Ash  
Barleyhurst Park Primary School, Bletchley
Bishop Parker RC Primary School, Bletchley  
Bow Brickhill CE Primary School, Bow Brickhill  
Bradwell Village School, Bradwell
Brooklands Farm Primary School, Brooklands
Brooksward School, Neath Hill
Broughton Fields Primary School, Broughton
Bushfield School, Wolverton
Caroline Haslett Primary School, Shenley Lodge
Castlethorpe First School, Castlethorpe
Cedars Primary School, Newport Pagnell
Charles Warren Academy, Simpson
Chestnuts Primary School, Bletchley  
Christ The Sower Ecumenical Primary School, Grange Farm
Cold Harbour CE School, Bletchley
Downs Barn School, Downs Barn
Drayton Park School, Bletchley
Emerson Valley School, Emerson Valley
Fairfields Primary School, Fairfields
Falconhurst School, Eaglestone
Germander Park School, Conniburrow
Giffard Park Primary School, Giffard Park
Giles Brook Primary School, Tattenhoe
Glastonbury Thorne School, Shenley Church End
Glebe Farm School, Glebe Farm
Great Linford Primary School, Great Linford 
Green Park Primary School, Newport Pagnell
Greenleys First School, Greenleys
Greenleys Juniors School, Greenleys
Hanslope Primary School, Hanslope
Haversham Village School, Haversham
Heelands School, Heelands
Heronsgate School, Walnut Tree
Heronshaw School, Walnut Tree
Holmwood School, Great Holm
Holne Chase Primary School, Bletchley
Howe Park School, Emerson Valley
Jubilee Wood Primary School, Fishermead
Kents Hill Park School, Kents Hill
Kents Hill School, Kents Hill
Knowles Primary School, Bletchley 
Langland Community School, Netherfield
Lavendon School, Lavendon
Long Meadow School, Shenley Brook End
Loughton Manor First School, Loughton
Loughton School, Loughton
Merebrook Infant School, Furzton
Middleton Primary School, Middleton
Monkston Primary School, Monkston
Moorland Primary School, Beanhill
New Bradwell School, New Bradwell
New Chapter Primary School, Coffee Hall  
Newton Blossomville CE School, Newton Blossomville
Newton Leys Primary School, Newton Leys
North Crawley CE School, North Crawley
Oakgrove School, Oakgrove
Oldbrook First School, Oldbrook
Olney Infant Academy, Olney
Olney Middle School, Olney
Orchard Academy, Springfield
Oxley Park Academy, Oxley Park
Pepper Hill School, Bradville
Portfields Primary School, Newport Pagnell  
The Premier Academy, Bletchley  
Priory Common School, Bradwell
Priory Rise School, Tattenhoe Park
Rickley Park Primary Academy, Bletchley  
Russell Street School, Stony Stratford
St Andrew's CE Infants School, Great Linford
St Bernadette's RC Primary School, Monkston 
St Mary & St Giles CE School, Stony Stratford
St Mary Magdalene RC Primary School, Greenleys
St Mary's Wavendon CE Primary School, Eagle Farm
St Monica's RC Primary School, Neath Hill
St Thomas Aquinas RC Primary School, Bletchley
Shepherdswell Academy, Springfield
Sherington CE School, Sherington
Southwood School, Conniburrow
Stanton School, Bradville
Stoke Goldington CE School, Stoke Goldington
Summerfield School, Bradwell Common
Tickford Park Primary School, Newport Pagnell
Two Mile Ash School, Two Mile Ash
Water Hall Primary School, Bletchley
Wavendon Gate School, Wavendon Gate
Whitehouse Primary School, Whitehouse
Willen Primary School, Willen
The Willows School, Fishermead
Wood End Infant & Pre-School, Stantonbury
Wyvern School, Wolverton

Secondary schools

Denbigh School, Shenley Church End
Glebe Farm School, Glebe Farm
The Hazeley Academy, Hazeley
Kents Hill Park School, Kents Hill
Lord Grey Academy, Bletchley
Milton Keynes Academy, Leadenhall
Oakgrove School, Middleton
Ousedale School, Newport Pagnell/Olney
The Radcliffe School, Wolverton
St Paul's Catholic School, Leadenhall
Shenley Brook End School, Shenley Brook End
Sir Herbert Leon Academy, Bletchley
Stantonbury School, Stantonbury
Walton High School, Walnut Tree/Brooklands
Watling Academy, Whitehouse

Special and alternative schools

Bridge Academy, Coffee Hall
Milton Keynes Primary Pupil Referral Unit, Bletchley
The Redway School, Netherfield
Romans Field School, Bletchley
Slated Row School, Wolverton
Stephenson Academy, Stantonbury
The Walnuts School, Hazeley
White Spire School, Bletchley

Further education
Milton Keynes College

Independent schools

Primary and preparatory schools
Broughton Manor Preparatory School, Broughton
The Grove Independent School, Loughton
Milton Keynes Preparatory School, Bletchley

Senior and all-through schools
Baytul Ilm Secondary School, Denbigh
Webber Independent School, Stantonbury

Special and alternative schools
Cambian Bletchley Park School, Bletchley
KWS Milton Keynes, Bletchley

Milton Keynes
Schools in Milton Keynes